Liège is the easternmost province of the Wallonia region of Belgium.

Liège Province is the only Belgian province that has borders with three countries. It borders (clockwise from the north) the Dutch province of Limburg, the German states of North Rhine-Westphalia and Rhineland-Palatinate, Clervaux (canton) in Luxembourg, the Belgian Walloon (French-speaking) provinces of Luxembourg, Namur and Walloon Brabant and the Belgian Flemish (Dutch-speaking) provinces of Flemish Brabant and Limburg.

Part of the eastern-most area of the province, bordering Germany, is the German-speaking region of Eupen-Malmedy, which became part of Belgium in the aftermath of World War I.

The capital and the largest city of the province is the city of the same name, Liège.

History 

The modern borders of the province of Liège date from 1795, which saw the unification of the Principality of the Prince-Bishopric of Liège with the revolutionary French Department of the Ourthe (sometimes spelled Ourte). (Parts of the old Principality of Liège also went into new French départements Meuse-Inférieure, and Sambre-et-Meuse.)

The province of Ourthe, as it was known then, was under French control during the reign of Napoleon Bonaparte.  Napoleon visited the city during one of his campaigns and ordered the destruction of its vineyards in order to prevent the Liège wine industry from competing with its French counterpart.

Following Napoleon's fall from power in 1815, Liège became part of the Kingdom of the Netherlands, while eastern half of modern Verviers became part of the Kingdom of Prussia. Liège University scholars helped to write the new Dutch constitution after the Napoleonic Wars. Despite these contributions there was a widespread perception among the people of Liège that they were discriminated against by the Dutch government due to religious and language differences.

In September 1830, rumors spread that Walloons in Brussels were expelling the Dutch. Liège intellectuals responded to these events by contacting Walloon scholars living in Paris to discuss Belgian independence.  A militia was formed to press these demands led by Charlier "Wooden Leg" leading (eventually) to the formation of an independent Kingdom of Belgium.

In the 19th century, the province was an early center of the Industrial Revolution. Its rich coal deposits and steel factories helped Belgium to form the basis of the region's increasing economic power.

During the 20th century, due to Liège's borders with Germany, it saw fierce fighting in both World Wars. In World War I, Liège's strong line of reinforced concrete military forts temporarily halted the German advance through Belgium, giving time to construct trenches in Flanders which subsequently saw some of the worst fighting of that war. It also saw some of the war's worst civilian casualties as the Imperial German Army performed collective punishments against local villagers for acts of resistance. In 1925 the East Cantons and Neutral Moresnet, that had become part of Belgium as a result of the Treaty of Versailles, were absorbed into the province of Liège.

In World War II, Liège was the site of major fighting during the Battle of the Bulge. There, the Germans orchestrated their final offensive move against the combined Allied armies. Malmedy and Saint-Vith in particular saw intense battles against the Nazis. Malmedy was the site of a Waffen-SS massacre of U.S. Army prisoners of war. 

Liège's heavy industry thrived in the 1950s and 1960sbut this has been in steady decline since that time. Liège is the last city of Wallonia that still maintains a functioning steel industry.

Liège continues to be the economic and cultural capital of Wallonia, with its university, medieval heritage and heavy industry.

Politics

Provincial Council

2006–2012

2012–2018

2018–2024

Geography

Rivers 
Roannay

Economy 
The Gross domestic product (GDP) of the province was 31.6 billion € in 2018, accounting for 6.9% of Belgium's economic output. GDP per capita adjusted for purchasing power was 25,200 € or 84% of the EU27 average in the same year. GDP per person employed was 108% of the EU27 average.

Subdivisions

Arrondissements
The Province of Liège is divided into four administrative arrondissements:

Municipalities

Municipalities that have city status have a (city) behind their name.

 Amay
 Amel
 Ans
 Anthisnes
 Aubel
 Awans
 Aywaille
 Baelen
 Bassenge
 Berloz
 Beyne-Heusay
 Blegny
 Braives
 Büllingen
 Burdinne
 Burg-Reuland
 Bütgenbach
 Chaudfontaine
 Clavier
 Comblain-au-Pont
 Crisnée
 Dalhem
 Dison
 Donceel
 Engis
 Esneux
 Eupen (city)
 Faimes
 Ferrières
 Fexhe-le-Haut-Clocher
 Flémalle
 Fléron
 Geer
 Grâce-Hollogne
 Hamoir
 Hannut (city)
 Héron
 Herstal
 Herve (city)
 Huy (city)
 Jalhay
 Juprelle
 Kelmis
 Liège (city)
 Lierneux
 Limbourg (city)
 Lincent
 Lontzen
 Malmedy (city)
 Marchin
 Modave
 Nandrin
 Neupré
 Olne
 Oreye
 Ouffet
 Oupeye
 Pepinster
 Plombières
 Raeren
 Remicourt
 Saint-Georges-sur-Meuse
 Saint-Nicolas
 Sankt Vith (city)
 Seraing (city)
 Soumagne
 Spa (city)
 Sprimont
 Stavelot (city)
 Stoumont
 Theux
 Thimister-Clermont
 Tinlot
 Trois-Ponts
 Trooz
 Verlaine
 Verviers (city)
 Villers-le-Bouillet
 Visé (city)
 Waimes
 Wanze
 Waremme (city)
 Wasseiges
 Welkenraedt

Nine municipalities of Liège form the German-speaking Community of Belgium. From north to south they are: Kelmis (43), Lontzen (48), Raeren (60), Eupen (27), Bütgenbach (17), Büllingen (14), Amel (2), Sankt Vith (64), and Burg-Reuland (16) municipalities. Malmedy (49) and Waimes (80) are municipalities with language facilities for German speakers. The other municipalities of Liège are part of the French Community of Belgium.

List of governors

1830–1831:   Etienne de Sauvage (Liberal)
1831–1832:   Jean-François Tielemans (Liberal)
1832–1844:   Charles van den Steen de Jehay
1844–1846:   Henri de Brouckère (Liberal)
1846–1847:   Edmond de la Coste (Liberal)
1847–1863:   Ferdinand de Macar (Liberal)
1863–1882:   Charles de Luesemans (Liberal)
1882–1908:   Léon Pety de Thozée
1908–1919:   Henry Delvaux de Fenffe (Catholic Party)
1919–1927:   Gaston Gregoire (Liberal)
1927–1937:   Henri Pirard
1937–1943:   Jules Mathieu
1944–1953:   Joseph Leclercq (PSB)
1953–1971:   Pierre Clerdent (PRL)
1972–1990:   Gilbert Mottard (PS)
1990–2004:   Paul Bolland
2004–2015: Michel Foret (MR)
2015–present Hervé Jamar (MR)

References

External links 

 Official web site of the Liège province 
  Bureau des Relations Extérieures de la Province de Liège 

 
NUTS 2 statistical regions of the European Union
Provinces of Wallonia
German-speaking countries and territories